Carlos Collado Mena (born 12 July 1938) is a Spanish politician and member of the Spanish Socialist Workers' Party (PSOE) from the Region of Murcia who served as the second President of the Region of Murcia from March 1984 to April 1993.

References

1938 births
Presidents of the Region of Murcia
Members of the Regional Assembly of Murcia
Politicians from the Region of Murcia
Spanish Socialist Workers' Party politicians
Living people
Members of the 2nd Senate of Spain